Gilles Bernier (born August 6, 1955 in Grand Falls, New Brunswick, Canada) is a former Canadian politician. He was elected to the House of Commons of Canada as a Progressive Conservative to represent the riding of Tobique—Mactaquac. He was the Progressive Conservative Critic for Public Works and Government Services in 1998 and was a member of the Canadian House of Commons Standing Committee on Natural Resources and Government Operations.

References

1955 births
Living people
Members of the House of Commons of Canada from New Brunswick
People from Grand Falls, New Brunswick
Progressive Conservative Party of Canada MPs